The  was an electric multiple unit (EMU) train type operated by the private railway operator Choshi Electric Railway in Chiba Prefecture, Japan, between 1939 and 1999.

History

Rebuilding
BoDeHa 101 was renumbered DeHa 101 from 29 May 1950, and in December 1952, it was rebuilt by Nippon Tetsudō Jidōsha Kōgyō with a new steel and wood-frame body with air-operated sliding doors.

The original trolley pole current collector was replaced by a bow collector in 1966.

Following the introduction of DeHa 501 in the 1970s, DeHa 101 was used less frequently, and was often used as a non-powered car sandwiched between DeHa 301 and DeHa 501. It was also sometimes used to haul freight services in place of the electric locomotive DeKi 3.

Miotsukushi filming
In 1985, DeHa 101 was used extensively in filming for the NHK TV drama series , which was shot on the Choshi Electric Railway. Budget limitations meant that the bow collector could not be replaced with its original trolley pole current collector, nor could the car be repainted into the period style livery of all-over brown.

Withdrawal and preservation
In later years, the car was used as a storeroom at Kasagami-Kurohae Station, and was officially withdrawn on 31 March 1999. It remained dumped at Kasagami-Kurohae Station until it was cut up on 27 September 2009. The Amemiya plate-frame bogies were preserved, however, with the Tokawa-end bogie donated to the Tobu Museum in Tokyo, and the Chōshi-end bogie preserved at Ōgo Depot on the Jōmō Electric Railway in Gunma Prefecture.

References

External links

 Choshi Electric Railway rolling stock profiles 

Electric multiple units of Japan
Train-related introductions in 1939
1939 in rail transport

ja:銚子電気鉄道線#過去の車両
600 V DC multiple units